The German People's Group in Czecho-Slovakia (abbreviated DVG) was a German minority political party in the Second Czechoslovak Republic from October 30, 1938 to March 1939.

Formation
The Sudeten German Party (SdP) was banned by the Czechoslovak government on September 15, 1938, in the midst of the Sudeten crisis. In areas that had remained in Czechoslovakia after the German annexation of Sudetenland its followers re-grouped as DVG. The party had a Nazi profile and represented German state interests towards Czechoslovakia.

DVG was launched on October 30, 1938. In Carpatho-Ukraine the movement worked under the name German People's Council (Deutsche Volksrat). Ernst Kundt was the leader of the party and in-charge (Volksgruppeführer) in Bohemia and Moravia, 
and Anton Ernst Oldofredi the leader of the German People's Council in Carpatho-Ukraine.

Press
In Brno the party published Tagesboten, which was renamed as Volksdeutsche Zeitung in February 1939. Volksdeutsche Zeitung was published from Prague and Brno.

National Assembly
After the annexation of Sudetenland, six of the SdP/KdP members of the Chamber of Deputies and four of its senators had remained in Czechoslovakia. One of them, deputy Gustav Peters, resigned from his seat on November 5, 1938. On November 7, 1938 the remaining five deputies formed the Club of German National Socialist Deputies as their new parliamentary faction. The Club was chaired by Kundt. The four other members were Franz Karmasin (of Slovakia), Robert Mayr-Harting, Hans Lokscha and Stanislav Králíček. On the same day the four senators formed the Club of German National Socialist Senators, chaired by Dr. Karl Hilgenreiner. The three other Senators were Kurt Brass, Sigmund Keil and Emil Schrammel.

In Carpatho-Ukraine
The German People's Council functioned as the Nazi unity party amongst the German minority in the Carpatho-Ukraine 1938–1939. In the elections to the Soim (parliament of Carpatho-Ukraine) held on February 12, 1939 the party was able to get Oldofredi elected as its candidate on the unity list of Ukrainian National Union (UNO).

References

German diaspora political parties
Interwar minority parties in Czechoslovakia
Nazi parties
Political parties established in 1938
Political parties disestablished in 1939
1938 establishments in Czechoslovakia
1939 disestablishments in Czechoslovakia
German nationalist political parties
Czechoslovakia–Germany relations